Hypoptopoma steindachneri is a species of catfish in the family Loricariidae. It is native to South America, where it occurs in the Amazon River basin. It reaches 10 cm (3.9 inches) SL.

References 

Hypoptopomatini
Fish described in 1895